I Will Find You a Better Home is a 2020 Chinese television series. It is adapted from the Japanese drama Your Home is My Business!. It is one of the highest rated TV series of 2020, topping the viewing charts of the network it aired on and also recorded more than four billion views online.

Plot 
The drama starts off with Xu Wenchang trying to divorce his wife, Zhang Chengcheng, who was caught with her lover, causing the fake divorce to become reality. Later she told him that she is pregnant, hoping for a reconciliation but eventually when the baby was born, the DNA result shows the lover fathered the child. Xu is a branch manager in a large real estate agent company, and unexpectedly moves in with his colleague, Fang Sijin, also a branch manager sent by Beijing Head Office with plan to take over Xu. Eventually, they form some kind of relationship as they worked, and near the end, they became a couple, after Xu expressed his love for Fang in a song.

Cast
Sun Li as Fang Sijin
Luo Jin as Xu Wenchang
Zhang Meng as Zhang Chengcheng
Wang Zijian as Wang Zijian
Tian Lei as Lou Shanguan
Sun Jiayu as Zhu Shanshan
Yang Haoyu as Xie Tingfeng
 Hu Ke as Feng Chunhua

Award and nominations

References

External links 
 

2020 Chinese television series debuts